Leire Pajín Iraola (born September 16, 1976) is a Spanish socialist politician.  She served as a minister under José Luis Rodríguez Zapatero.

Early life and education
Pajín was born in San Sebastián but moved with her parents to Benidorm when she was a child. She graduated at the University of Alicante with a Sociology degree in 1998.

Career
In 2000 and 2004 Pajín was elected to the Congress of Deputies representing Alicante.

Although she had no professional experience outside her political party, Pajín was chosen to serve as the Secretary of State for International Cooperation and the President of the Spanish Agency for International Development Cooperation (AECID) from 2004 to 2008 in the first Zapatero government. In this capacity, she was involved in the development and approval of the Master Plan for Spanish Cooperation (2005-2008) that increased Spanish official development aid threefold to 0.5% of GDP. From 2007, she was a member of the World Bank Group’s High Level Advisory Council on Women's Economic Empowerment, which was chaired by Danny Leipziger and Heidemarie Wieczorek-Zeul.

After serving as Minister of Health in 2010/11 Pajín remained deputy for Alicante.

In July 2012 Pajín announced that she would temporarily quit politics and consequently her seat in the Chamber of Deputies. Between 2012 and 2014, she served as Special Advisor to the Pan American Health Organization (PAHO) and was a policy advisor to the United Nations Development Programme (UNDP) Post-2015 Agenda team.

Other activities
 OECD Development Centre on Latin America, Member of the Advisory Board on the Latin American Economic Outlook 2008

References

1976 births
Politicians from San Sebastián
Spanish Socialist Workers' Party politicians
Health ministers of Spain
Living people
Women government ministers of Spain
University of Alicante alumni
People from Benidorm
Members of the 7th Congress of Deputies (Spain)
Members of the 8th Congress of Deputies (Spain)
Members of the 9th Congress of Deputies (Spain)
Members of the 10th Congress of Deputies (Spain)